Ashes Cricket 2009 is a cricket video game developed by Transmission Games and published by Codemasters in the UK and by Namco Bandai in Australia. It has been released for the PlayStation 3, Xbox 360 and Microsoft Windows. A Wii version, developed by Gusto Games, has also been released. The Wii version was released simply as Cricket in Australia. A sequel, International Cricket 2010 was released on 18 June 2010.

The game is licensed by the ECB (England and Wales Cricket Board), Cricket Australia and the Marylebone Cricket Club (MCC), owners of the Ashes Urn. It includes all the official players of the Australian cricket team and the England cricket team, however the other teams are not licensed.

Overview 
According to the game, the game includes an intuitive, interactive bowling control scheme and dynamic and intuitive batting, with greater coverage and shot choice than previous games. The game also features official Hawk-Eye visualisations during play.

The game features two player co-op play, with up to four player versus matches. The PC, PS3 and Xbox 360 versions also feature full online multiplayer. The PC, PS3 and Xbox 360 versions also feature a coaching mode where they can learn the disciplines of batting, bowling and fielding from Sir Ian Botham and Shane Warne.

The game features commentary by Tony Greig, Jonathan Agnew, Shane Warne, Ian Bishop and Sir Ian Botham.

Release

Demo 
The demo consists of a 6 over (3 overs per side) Ashes Test match at Lord's where the player is able to choose whether to bat or field. The demo was released for the Xbox 360 on 24 July and for the PC on 30 July, but there was no demo released for PlayStation 3.

Patch 
A patch was released on before 23 September 2009 for the PC version.
A beta patch for PC was released on 21 September. A second beta (beta version 2) for the PC was released on 28 September. No further patches came for the PC, and no any patch was released for the PS3 and Xbox 360 versions of the game. This has primarily been due to the game developer Transmission going into receivership.

The patch for the game was confirmed to be in progress during a Q&A conducted with Codemasters Producer Jamie Firth by Planetcricket.net. Among the issues addressed in the then-upcoming patch are the prevalence of run-outs, as well as excessive run rates, edged deliveries not carrying, and incorrect bowler speeds. The estimated dates for the release of the patch were initially "...within two weeks".

Reception 

Official PlayStation Magazine awarded the game an 8 out of 10. IGN UK scored it at 8.2, The Guardian and Times newspapers each giving it 4 out of 5 stars. Planetcricket.net gave it 7.5. SPOnG.com's Tim Smith awarded the game 85%.
The 360, PS3 and PC version ranked at the top of the all format UK charts according to Chart Track during the first week of release. The Wii version ranked first during the week beginning 15 August.

References

External links 
Official Ashes Cricket 2009 Site

Cricket video games
Codemasters games
2009 video games
Windows games
PlayStation 3 games
Wii games
Xbox 360 games
Video games developed in Australia
Video games set in Antigua and Barbuda
Video games set in Australia
Video games set in India
Video games set in Jamaica
Video games set in New Zealand
Video games set in Pakistan
Video games set in South Africa
Video games set in Sri Lanka
Video games set in Trinidad and Tobago
Video games set in the United Kingdom
Video games set in Zimbabwe
Video games set in England
The Ashes
Video games developed in the United Kingdom
Bandai Namco games
Multiplayer and single-player video games
Transmission Games games